Nephus is a genus of lady beetles in the family Coccinellidae. There are more than 25 described species in Nephus. Several former species are now in the genus Scymnobius.

Species

References

External links

 Biolib
  Fauna europaea
 ITIS

Coccinellidae genera
Taxa named by Étienne Mulsant